The Canadian Journal of Speech-Language Pathology and Audiology (CJSLPA) / Revue canadienne d'orthophonie et d'audiologie (RCOA) is a peer-reviewed, online journal of clinical practice for audiologists, speech-language pathologists and researchers. It is published by Speech-Language & Audiology Canada.

CJSLPA is an open access journal, with all articles available on the internet immediately upon publication. The journal does not charge publication or processing fees.

The purpose of CJSLPA is to disseminate current knowledge pertaining to hearing, balance and vestibular function, feeding/swallowing, speech, language and social communication across the lifespan. It is not restricted to a particular age or diagnostic group.

The journal was established in 1973 as Human Communication and renamed to Journal of Speech-Language Pathology and Audiology in 1990, before obtaining its current title in 2007.

See also
 Open access in Canada

External links 
 

Quarterly journals
Audiology journals
Publications established in 1973
Multilingual journals
Academic journals published by learned and professional societies of Canada